Meet Mr. Callaghan is a 1954 British crime drama film directed by Charles Saunders and starring Derrick De Marney. Based on the 1938 novel The Urgent Hangman by Peter Cheyney, which Cheyney had then turned into a play.

Co-producer and star Derrick de Marney had directed the stage version of Meet Mr. Callaghan at the Garrick Theatre in 1952, which starred Derrick's brother Terence as Cheyney's private eye Slim Callaghan. Derrick played this role in the film.

The play was notable for the theme music and score by Eric Spear which became a best-selling record for Les Paul.

Plot
Down at heel private detective Slim Callaghan is hired by young socialite Cynthis Meraulton to investigate other family members after her rich stepfather changes his will in her favour. She suspects he will be killed and the new will destroyed. When her stepfather is subsequently murdered, suspicion falls on Cynthis.

Cast 
 Derrick De Marney as Slim Callaghan
 Harriette Johns as Cynthis Meraulton 
 Adrienne Corri as Mayola
 Delphi Lawrence as Effie 
 Belinda Lee as Jenny Appleby 
 Larry Burns as Darky 
 Peter Neil as William Meraulton 
 Robert Adair as August Meraulton
 Trevor Reid as Inspector Gringall 
 John Longden as Jeremy Meraulton 
 Roger Williams as Bellamy Meraulton 
 Frank Henderson as Paul Meraulton
 Frank Sieman as Sergeant Fields
 Michael Partridge as Jengel
 Howard Douglas as 	Tweest
 John Ainsworth as 	P.C. Masters
 Michael Balfour as Coffee Stallkeeper

Production
Peter Cheyney's novel The Urgent Hangman was published in 1938. It was the first in a series of novels by Cheyney featured private investigator Slim Callaghan, others including Dangerous Curves (1939), You Can't Keep the Change (1940), It Couldn't Matter Less (1941), Sorry You've Been Troubled (1942), They Never Say When (1944) and Uneasy Terms (1946). Uneasy Terms was turned into a 1948 film.

The Urgent Hangman was adapted by Gerald Verner into a play Meet Mr Callaghan which premiered at the Garrick Theatre in 1952. The role of Slim Callaghan was played by Terence De Marney and the production was directed by de Marney's brother Derrick. The play was very successful, with 340 performances. It inspired a hit song.

Terence De Marney played Callaghan in another Gerald Verne theatrical adaptation of a Callaghan story, Dangerous Curves, which premiered at the Garrick in April 1953.

In the film version of Meet Mr Callaghan, the role of Slim Callaghan was played by Derrick de Marney, not Terence. Filming took place at Nettleford Studios in September 1953.

It was the second film from Belinda Lee.

Critical reception
Monthly Film Bulletin said the "transference" from stage to screen "has been made without much imagination. The involved plot is helped along by a few barbed lines but Derrick de Marney fails to make a sympathetic hero out of a private detective who stoops to robbery, blackmail and bribery in his investigations."

TV Guide wrote, "Mystery programmer has a couple of good moments, but little else": whereas MysteryFile noted, "The detective work is very good, and the complicated plot holds together, but it's the overall sense of good humor that really carries the day — not laugh out loud funny, but the mood is light enough to smile almost constantly."

References

External links
 
Meet Mr Callaghan at BFI
Meet Mr Callaghan at Letterbox DVD

Complete film at Internet Archive
Complete novel of The Urgent Hangman at Free Red

1954 films
British crime drama films
British black-and-white films
1954 crime films
Films directed by Charles Saunders
Films based on British novels
Films scored by Eric Spear
Films shot at Nettlefold Studios
1950s English-language films
1950s British films